Rocktown may refer to:

Rocktown (Georgia), a rock-climbing area in Georgia.
Rocktown, New Jersey, an unincorporated community in New Jersey.